Kanisi (also Romanized as Kanīsī; also known as Kānespī, Kānsī, and Kīnesī) is a village in Beradust Rural District, Sumay-ye Beradust District, Urmia County, West Azerbaijan Province, Iran. At the 2006 census, its population was 473, in 73 families.

References 

Populated places in Urmia County